Rock rose, rock-rose, and rockrose are common names of various plants, including:

 Cistaceae
 Cistus
 Halimium
 Helianthemum
 Pavonia lasiopetala
 Phemeranthus
 Portulaca grandiflora